Gol Tappeh-ye Kabir (also Romanized as Gol Tappeh-ye Kabīr and Gol Tappeh-ye Kavīr; also known as Gol Tappeh and Gul Tepe) is a village in Qaleh Now Rural District of Qaleh Now District of Ray County, Tehran province, Iran. At the 2006 National Census, its population was 936 in 250 households, when it was in Kahrizak District. The following census in 2011 counted 2,515 people in 286 households. The latest census in 2016 showed a population of 10,850 people in 219 households, by which time it was in Qaleh Now District. It was the largest village in its rural district.

References 

Ray County, Iran

Populated places in Tehran Province

Populated places in Ray County, Iran